Compsosaurus (meaning "elegant lizard") is an extinct genus of phytosaur, a crocodile-like reptile that lived during the Triassic. Its fossils have been found in North Carolina. The type species, Compsosaurus priscus, was named by American paleontologist Joseph Leidy in 1856, although other sources say 1857. Compsosaurus may have been the same animal as the related Belodon.

Only four teeth are known, discovered in the Carnian-Rhaetian-aged coal fields of Chatham County, North Carolina (probably Red Sandstone Formation) and the New Oxford Formation of Pennsylvania.

References

Phytosaurs
Prehistoric reptile genera
Late Triassic reptiles of North America
Triassic geology of North Carolina
Fossils of North Carolina
Triassic geology of Pennsylvania
Paleontology in Pennsylvania
Nomina dubia
Fossil taxa described in 1856
Taxa named by Joseph Leidy